Echinopsis lageniformis (syn. Trichocereus bridgesii), the Bolivian torch cactus, is a fast-growing columnar cactus from the high deserts of Bolivia. 
Among the indigenous populations of Bolivia, it is sometimes called achuma or wachuma, although these names are also applied to related species such as Echinopsis pachanoi which are also used for their psychedelic effects.

Description
The plant has a greenish to bluish color and usually has four to eight ribs. Spines can range in coloration from honey-coloured to brown, and are located on the nodes in groups of up to four. These spines can grow up to 6–7 cm in length and in fully grown plants are spaced evenly on the ribs, 2.5 to 3 cm apart.

Cultivars
Several varieties of this species are highly prized by ornamental cactus collectors. These include a cristate variety, two variants of monstrose growth, and a more recently developed clone that exhibits both monstrose and cristate growth. These all tend to be much slower growing than the standard form of the species, but owing to their highly unusual shapes, they are sought after by cactus collectors.

The monstrose form of Echinopsis lageniformis is known as the penis plant or penis cactus. Contrary to the typical columnar habit of the species, this cultivar displays short stem sections that branch avidly, forming a low spiny bush. The upper part of each stem segment is smooth and spineless, resembling a penis. The lower part is spiny and shows a tendency to form ribs. The plant is light green.  The German name for this cultivar, Frauenglück, more euphemistic than its English equivalent, translates as "women's joy".

Psychoactivity
The plant contains a number of psychoactive alkaloids, in particular the well-studied chemical mescaline typically at levels more reliable than Echinopsis pachanoi but lower than some extraordinarily potent Echinopsis pachanoi specimens: it was reported 0.56% dry weight mescaline content for E. lageniformis, while up to 4,7% for E. pachanoi. The concentrations for specimens from various locations vary considerably and E. lageniformis may sometimes contain higher mescaline content than E. pachanoi although that 0.56% concentration was the highest reported in any research. Chemical analysis of some variants of this species have shown it may include some of the most potent of the psychedelic Trichocereus species, although this is not conclusive nor does it apply to all strains of the species. Outside of its native habitat, it is one of the lesser known and used of the Trichocereus cacti for either its psychoactive or ornamental uses. This is not true in areas where it is the dominant species, for example, the La Paz area of Bolivia.

As with related species, it seems to have long shamanic tradition of use throughout its native habitat.

Gallery

Legality

See also
 Psychedelic plants

References

External links

  Leda.lycaeum.org: Trichocereus bridgesii (Achuma)

lageniformis
Cacti of South America
Endemic flora of Bolivia
Entheogens
Herbal and fungal hallucinogens
Psychedelic phenethylamine carriers
Garden plants of South America